Under Age may refer to:

 Under Age (1941 film), an American crime film directed by Edward Dmytryk
 Under Age (1964 film), an American drama film